Stone Well is a settlement in South Australia. It is on the western side of the North Para River in the Barossa Valley. The current boundaries for the locality were established in May 1995 for the long-established name. The boundaries are the North Para River, Smyth Road, Stonewell Road and Seppeltsfield Road.

References

Towns in South Australia